Bohdan Sylvestrovych Stupka (27 August 1941 – 22 July 2012) was a popular Ukrainian actor and the minister of culture of Ukraine. He was born in Kulykiv, General Government to Ukrainian parents. In 2001, he was a member of the jury at the 23rd Moscow International Film Festival. At the 26th Moscow International Film Festival he won the award for Best Actor for his role in Our Own.

Stupka played in more than a hundred roles in films and over fifty in theaters. Stupka was awarded the titles Artist of Ukraine, People's Artist of the USSR, and Hero of Ukraine.

Bohdan Stupka was buried in Baikove Cemetery in Kyiv.

His son Ostap Stupka is also an actor.

Awards
Kyiv Pectoral Award in the category "Best Male Role", play by Irena Kowal: ("The Lion and the Lioness") (2001)
Golden Aries Award in the category "Best Male Role" (Our Own) (2004)
Silver George prize of the Moscow International Film Festival - "Best Male Role" (Our Own) (2004)
Golden Eagle Award  in the category "Best Supporting Actor" (A Driver for Vera) (2005)
Nika Award in the nomination "Best male role" (Our Own) (2005)
Golden Eagle Award in the category "Best Male Role in Cinema" (Taras Bulba) (2010)
Golden Eagle Award in the category "Best Supporting Actor" (Home) (2012)

Selected filmography

1971: White Bird with Black Mark (Ukrainian SSR) - Orest
1971: Ozareniye - Yuriy Morozenko
1972: Contrary to Everything (Ukrainian SSR/Yugoslavia)
1973: The Last Day - Valera
1973: Naperekor vsemu - Simeon
1973: Novoselye - Danko
1975: Waves of the Black Sea (Ukrainian SSR) - Troyan
1977: The Right for Love (Ukrainian SSR) - Yakov
1979: Zabud'te slovo 'smert'''
1980: Dudaryky (Ukrainian SSR) - Leontovich
1980: Inache nelzya1981: Ot Buga do Visly - Conjurer
1982: Tayny svyatogo Yura1983: Whirlpool (Ukrainian SSR)
1984: Vsyo nachinayetsya s lyubvi - Antonyuk
1984: Stolen Happiness (Ukrainian SSR)
1985: Zhenikhi1986: Schastliv, kto lyubil1987: Danylo - kniaz of Halychyna (Ukrainian SSR) - Sudich
1988: 'Stone Soul (Ukrainian SSR) - Sergey Muratov
1988: Generalnaya repetitsiya
1990: Nyne proslavisya syn chelovecheskiy - Arkhierey (Pavel) 
1991: Kremlevskiye tayni XVI veka - Boris Godunov 
1991: Sin (Ukraine)
1992: Radi semeynogo ochaga
1992: Gospodi, prosti nas, greshnykh
1992: Chotyry lysty fanery - Polkovnyk
1992: Four Sheets of Plywood (Ukraine)
1992: Taras Shevchenko. Testament (Ukraine)
1993: The Gray Wolves - V.E. Semichastnyj
1993: Fuchzhou (Ukraine)
1993: Doroga v ray
1993: The Road to Paradise (Russia/Germany)
1993: Trap (TV Series) (Ukraine)
1995: Odinokiy igrok
1995: Gelli i Nok
1996: Judenkreis, or Eternal Wheel (Ukraine)
1999: With Fire and Sword (Poland) - Bohdan Chmielnicki
1999: East/West (Bulgaria/France/Russia/Spain/Ukraine) - Colonel Boyko
1999: Chinese Service - Lapsin
2002: A Prayer for Hetman Mazepa (Ukraine) - Hetman Mazepa
2003: An Ancient Tale: When the Sun Was a God (Poland) - Popiel
2004: Our Own (Russia) - Old Man
2004: A Driver for Vera (Ukraine/Russia) - General Serov
2005: Stealing Tarantino (TV Mini-Series) (Russia) - Feliks Dobrzhansky
2006: Strange Christmas (Ukraine) - Leonid Ilyich Brezhnev
2007: Two in One (Russia) - Segment 2 - Andrei / father
2007: Troe i Snezhinka - Andrew's Father
2007: The Russian Triangle (Georgia)
2007: 1814 (Russia)
2008: Sappho (Summer Lover) (Ukraine) - Professor Orlov
2008: Alexander (Russia) - Knyaz Yaroslav
2008: Serce na dloni - Konstanty
2009: Taras Bulba (Russia) - Taras Bulba
2009: Insayt - Old Man 
2010: Chantrapas (Georgia) - L'ambassadeur
2010: Ivanov - Pavel Kirillyich Lebedev
2010: Platon Anhel (TV Movie) (Ukraine)
2011: Brothel Lights - Zaslavsky
2011: Home (Russia) - Grigory Ivanovich Shamanov
2011: Ottorzhenie - Ivan Pavlovich
2013: Podporuchik Romashov
2015: 12 mesyatsev. Novaya skazka - Dekabr (final film role)

References

External links

1941 births
2012 deaths
20th-century Ukrainian male actors
Soviet male film actors
Soviet male stage actors
Ukrainian male film actors
Ukrainian male stage actors
Culture and art ministers of Ukraine
Recipients of the title of Hero of Ukraine
Recipients of the Shevchenko National Prize
Academicians of the Russian Academy of Cinema Arts and Sciences "Nika"
People from Lviv Oblast
21st-century Ukrainian male actors
Recipients of the Order of Prince Yaroslav the Wise, 5th class
Recipients of the Order of Prince Yaroslav the Wise, 4th class
Recipients of the Order of Honour (Russia)
Officers of the Order of Merit of the Republic of Poland
People's Artists of the USSR
Recipients of the USSR State Prize
Kyiv National I. K. Karpenko-Kary Theatre, Cinema and Television University alumni
Recipients of the Nika Award
Deaths from cancer in Ukraine
Deaths from bone cancer
Burials at Baikove Cemetery
Laureates of the Oleksandr Dovzhenko State Prize